La Matapédia is a regional county municipality (RCM) in eastern Quebec, Canada at the base of the Gaspé peninsula, in the Bas-Saint-Laurent region. Its seat is in Amqui. It is named after the Matapédia River which runs through the western part of the RCM.

La Matapédia was created on January 1, 1982, succeeding from the former Matapédia County Municipality. The region was subject to one of the last waves of colonization in Quebec, settled mostly by people from the Lower Saint-Lawrence between 1850 and 1950. It is a rural region in the Matapedia Valley crossed by the Notre Dame Mountains. Agriculture and logging, and its related industries (forestry and wood products), are the main economic activities.

Subdivisions
There are 25 subdivisions within the RCM:

Cities & Towns (2)
 Amqui
 Causapscal

Municipalities (7)
Albertville
Lac-au-Saumon
Sainte-Florence
Sainte-Marguerite-Marie
Saint-Vianney
Sayabec
Val-Brillant

Parishes (8)
Saint-Alexandre-des-Lacs
Saint-Cléophas
Saint-Damase
Sainte-Irène
Saint-Léon-le-Grand
Saint-Moïse
Saint-Tharcisius
Saint-Zénon-du-Lac-Humqui

Villages (1)
Saint-Noël

Unorganized Territory (7)
 Lac-Alfred
 Lac-Casault
 Lac-Matapédia
 Rivière-Patapédia-Est
 Rivière-Vaseuse
 Routhierville
 Ruisseau-des-Mineurs

Demographics

Population

Language

Transportation

Access routes
Highways and numbered routes that run through the municipality, including external routes that start or finish at the county border:

Autoroutes
None

Principal Highways

Secondary Highways

External Routes
None

See also
 List of regional county municipalities and equivalent territories in Quebec

References

 
Canada geography articles needing translation from French Wikipedia